Plewki may refer to the following places:
Plewki, Ostrołęka County in Masovian Voivodeship (east-central Poland)
Plewki, Wyszków County in Masovian Voivodeship (east-central Poland)
Plewki, Podlaskie Voivodeship (north-east Poland)
Plewki, Warmian-Masurian Voivodeship (north Poland)